Miccolamia relucens is a species of beetle in the family Cerambycidae. It was described by Holzschuh in 2003. It is known from India and Nepal.

References

Desmiphorini
Beetles described in 2003